The following is a comprehensive list of releases from Canadian independent record label Mau5trap.

Compilation albums

We Are Friends

Standard releases

2007 - 2009

2010

2011

2012

2013

2014

2015

2016

2017

2018

2019

2020

2021

2022

References

 Mau5trap Recordings discography at Discogs
 We Are Friends at Discogs

Discographies of Canadian record labels